The de Young Museum, formally the M. H. de Young Memorial Museum, is a fine arts museum located in San Francisco, California. Located in Golden Gate Park, it is a component of the Fine Arts Museums of San Francisco, along with the Legion of Honor. The de Young is named for early San Francisco newspaperman M. H. de Young.

History

The museum opened in 1895 as an outgrowth of the California Midwinter International Exposition of 1894 (a fair modeled on the Chicago World's Columbian Exposition of the previous year). It was housed in an Egyptian revival structure which had been the Fine Arts Building at the fair. The building was badly damaged in the 1906 San Francisco earthquake, and was closed for a year and a half for repairs. Before long, the museum's steady development called for a new space to better serve its growing audiences. Michael de Young responded by planning the building that would serve as the core of the de Young facility through the 20th century. Louis Christian Mullgardt, the coordinator for architecture for the 1915 Panama-Pacific International Exposition, designed the Spanish-Plateresque-style building. The new structure was completed in 1919 and formally transferred by de Young to the city's park commissioners. In 1921, de Young added a central section, together with a tower that would become the museum's signature feature, and the museum began to assume the basic configuration that it retained until 2000. De Young's efforts were honored with the changing of the museum's name to the M. H. de Young Memorial Museum. Another addition, a west wing, was completed in 1925, the year de Young died. In 1929 the original Egyptian-style building was declared unsafe and demolished.

By 1949, the elaborate cast concrete ornamentation of the original de Young was determined to be a hazard and removed because the salt air from the Pacific had rusted the supporting steel.

As part of the agreement that created the Fine Arts Museums of San Francisco in 1972, the de Young's collection of European art was sent to the Legion of Honor. In compensation, the de Young received the right to display the bulk of the organization's anthropological holdings. These include significant pre-Hispanic works from Teotihuacan and Peru, as well as indigenous tribal art from sub-Saharan Africa. The building was severely damaged by the 1989 Loma Prieta earthquake. It in turn was demolished and replaced by a new building in 2005. The only remaining original elements of the old de Young are the vases and sphinxes located near the Pool of Enchantment. The palm trees in front of the building are also original to the site.

The de Young’s Artist Studio is an artist-in-residency program to encourage arts community engagement and support emerging artists and since 2010 is part of the Cultural Encounters initiative.

Collections
The de Young showcases American art from the 17th through the 21st centuries, international contemporary art, textiles, and costumes, and art from the Americas, the Pacific and Africa.  The deYoung Museum Collections include: American Art, African Art, Oceanic Art, Arts of the Americas, Costume and Textile Arts, Graphic Arts, Photography and Sculpture. Some of the collection is accessible online on the museum website and Google Arts and Culture.

American
The American art collection consists of over 1,000 paintings, 800 sculptures, and 3,000 decorative arts objects. It includes works ranging from 1670 to the present day. Since its inception in the Fine Arts Building at the California Midwinter International Exposition of 1894 in Golden Gate Park, its subsequent institutionalization in the M. H. de Young Memorial Museum in 1924, and its reinstallation in the new de Young in 2005, the permanent collection has evolved exponentially.

In 1978, the American art collections were transformed by the decision of John D. Rockefeller III and Blanchette Hooker Rockefeller to donate their renowned collection of 110 paintings, 29 drawings, and 2 sculptures to the Fine Arts Museums of San Francisco where they would be on view at the de Young.

The de Young's chronological survey of American art includes galleries devoted to art in the following areas: Native American and Spanish Colonial; Anglo-Colonial; Federal era art and Neoclassical; Victorian genre and realism; trompe-l'œil still life; the Hudson River School, Barbizon, and Tonalism; Impressionism and the Ashcan School; Arts and Crafts; Modernism; Social Realism and American Scene; Surrealism and Abstraction; Beat, Pop, and Figurative; and Contemporary.

Although the permanent collection is national in scope, art made in California from the Gold Rush era to the present day is also on display in the de Young. Important California collections with national significance include examples of Spanish colonial, Arts and Crafts, and Bay Area Figurative and Assemblage art. Important among them are the most significant museum collections of works by Bay Area painter Chiura Obata and sculptor Ruth Asawa.

The permanent collection galleries integrate decorative arts objects with paintings and sculptures, emphasizing the artistic, social, and political context for the works on display. While essentially chronological, the installation also juxtaposes works from different cultures and time periods to emphasize the historical connections between works in the collection. Painters with paintings in this art museum include; John Singleton Copley, John Vanderlyn, Thomas Cole (Prometheus Bound), Thomas Hill, Thomas Wood (Newspaper Vendor), Samuel Brookes, John Peto, Childe Hassam, Edmund C. Tarbell (The Blue Veil), George Hitchcock, Maynard Dixon, Otis Oldfield, Granville Redmond, Thomas Hart Benton (Susannah and the Elders), David Park, Richard Diebenkorn, Mel Ramos, and Wayne Thiebaud.

In January 2017, the institution announced a significant new addition to its collection of American Art through the acquisition of 62 works by 22 contemporary African American Arts, including Thornton Dial's Blood And Meat: Survival For the World (1992) and Lost Cows (2000-1), Joe Light's Dawn (1988), Jessie T. Pettway's Bars and String-Pierced Columns (1950s), Lonnie Holley's Him and Her Hold the Root (1994) and Joe Minter's Camel at the Watering Hole (1995) The works are currently exhibited in Revelations: Art from the African American South, on view until April 1, 2018.[12].

The de Young is also opening the first-ever retrospective of Feminist Art pioneer Judy Chicago in 2020, forty years after her landmark installation The Dinner Party (1974–79) made its debut in San Francisco.

Archives of American Art
Since 1991, the American Art Department has housed a set of the Smithsonian Institution’s Archives of American Art microfilm collection. In conjunction with the Bothin Library and department research files, the American Art Study Center is the most important research center for American art on the West Coast.

International contemporary
In 1988, the Fine Arts Museums made a commitment to collect international contemporary art. In addition to works in traditional media, this commitment has expanded the museums’ holdings of works in new or multiple media––including installation and conceptual works, video and other time-based media, and photography and other lens-based media––to more accurately reflect contemporary art practice.
	
Recent contemporary acquisitions include Wall of Light Horizon (2005), by Sean Scully and signature sculptures by Zhan Wang and Cornelia Parker. The strength of the collection lies in artists associated with California, including 
Piotr Abraszewski, Christopher Brown, Squeak Carnwath, Jim Christensen, Robert Colescott, Hung Liu, Bruce Nauman, Rachel Neubauer, Ed Ruscha and Masami Teraoka.

Lens-based and time-based media represent a new area of growth, with works by Nigel Poor, Catherine Wagner, Rebeca Bollinger, Alan Rath and the Propeller Group. The museums have also acquired works by international artists such as Anish Kapoor, Odd Nerdrum, Gottfried Helnwein, Doris Salcedo, David Nash, Barbara Hepworth, and Richard Deacon.

Textiles and costumes
The Fine Arts Museums’ textiles collection boasts more than 13,000 textiles and costumes from around the world. It is one of the largest and most comprehensive collections of its type in the United States. It comprises costume and costume accessories; loom-woven textiles; non-woven fabrics; and objects whose primary decoration is produced through techniques such as beading and embroidery.

The de Young has exhibited fashion since the 1930s, with pieces by Dior, Balenciaga, Madame Grès, Yves Saint Laurent, Chanel, Ralph Rucci, and Kaisik Wong. There are equally compelling collections of 18th and 19th-century European fans, an excellent lace collection, a spectacular group of European ecclesiastical vestments and furnishings, and a growing collection of contemporary wearable art.

In August 2017 The Summer of Love Experience: Art, Fashion, and Rock & Roll marked another highlight at the de Young. The exhibition celebrated the 50th anniversary of the Summer of Love and featured fashion from the late sixties from the museum's permanent collection and on loan from Bay Area independent designers. The exhibit hosted 270,000 visitors.

In the fall of 2018, the de Young organized Contemporary Muslim Fashions. The exhibition explored Muslim female dress codes from multiple communities, cultures and religious interpretations, starting at the turn of the millennium. It was the first large scale exploration of the topic at an art institution, and included emerging and established designers and artists from Europe, the Middle East, South East Asia and the US. The exhibition will travel to Museum Angewandte Kunst in Frankfurt in the spring of 2019.

Africa, Pacific, and the Americas
More than 1,400 stellar examples from the eastern Sudan, the Guinea coast, west and central Africa, eastern and southern Africa, and elsewhere on the continent are included in the Fine Arts Museums’ African art collection at the de Young. The African art collection is presented thematically rather than geographically, emphasizing the aesthetic and expressive qualities of the art.

The Oceanic collections were charter collections of the de Young, their nucleus formed in 1894 at the California Midwinter International Exposition in Golden Gate Park. Additional Oceanic works of sculpture, basketry, tapa, ceramics, and lithics have since been acquired, bringing the holdings to more than 3,000. Highlights of the collection include a  housepost from the Iatmul people of the Sepik River in Papua New Guinea, a group of brightly painted carvings used in malanggan ceremonials of New Ireland, a roll of feather money from Nindu Island of Santa Cruz, a fan from the Marquesas Islands of Polynesia, a rare navigation figure from the Caroline Islands of Micronesia, and a selection of powerful wood carvings from the Maori peoples of New Zealand.

The Art of the Americas collections are of national significance to art history, anthropology, and world history, and they have helped establish the de Young as a primary source for cultural research and study. The extensive collection of ancient American and Native American art comprises nearly 2,000 works of art from Meso-America, Central and South America, and the West Coast of North America. Art from cultures indigenous to the American continents was a defining feature of the museum's charter collection and continues to be an area of significant growth. Special galleries are devoted to ancient objects from Mexico, including an outstanding grouping of Teotihuacan murals.

European

The permanent collection also contains some works by European painters, such as Salvador Dalí.

Selected collection highlights

Architecture

The current building was completed by architects Jacques Herzog, Pierre de Meuron and Fong + Chan and opened on October 15, 2005. Structural, civil and geotechnical engineering was provided by Rutherford & Chekene; Arup provided mechanical and electrical engineering. Herzog & de Meuron won the competition in January 1999 beating out other short-listed architects Tadao Ando and Antoine Predock. The terrain and seismic activity in San Francisco posed a challenge for the designers Herzog & de Meuron and principal architects Fong & Chan.  To help withstand future earthquakes, “[the building] can move up to three feet (91 centimeters) due to a system of ball-bearing sliding plates and viscous fluid dampers that absorb kinetic energy and convert it to heat”.

A new museum structure located in the middle of an urban park was initially controversial. San Francisco voters twice defeated bond measures that were to fund the new museum project. After the second defeat, the museum itself planned to relocate to a location in the financial district. However, an effort led by generous supporters arose and kept the museum in the Golden Gate Park.

The designers were sensitive to the appearance of the building in its natural setting. Walter Hood, a landscape architect based in Oakland, designed the museum's new gardens. In order to further harmonize with the surroundings, shapes were cut into the top to reveal gardens and courtyards where 48 trees had been planted, the giant tree-ferns that form a backdrop for the museum entrance are particularly dramatic. 5.12 acres (20,700 square meters) of new landscaping were planted as well, with 344 transplanted trees and 69 historic boulders. The building is clad with variably perforated and dimpled copper plates, whose patina will slowly change through exposure to the elements. This exterior facade was developed and fabricated by engineers at Zahner. A 144 ft. (44 m) observation tower allows visitors to see much of Golden Gate Park's Music Concourse (see below) and rises above the Park's treetops, providing a view of the Golden Gate and Marin Headlands.

The twisting 144 foot (44 m) tall tower is a distinctive feature, and can be seen rising above the canopy of Golden Gate Park from many areas of San Francisco. The museum offers a two-floor museum store, free access to the lobby and tower, and a full-service cafe with outdoor seating in the Osher Sculpture Garden.

See also 

 Bouquets to Art, annual floral exhibition based on collections in the museum

Notes

References

Ashmore, Lisa. “San Francisco's New de Young.” Architecture Week
Guthrie, Julian. “De Young's Rebirth.” San Francisco Chronicle, 15 October 2005.
King, John. “Into The Modern Age.” San Francisco Chronicle, 9 October 2005.
Sardar, Zahid. “Painting A New Landscape.” San Francisco Chronicle, 9 October 2005, retrieved 22 September 2006.

External links
 Official De Young Museum website
 Critiquethis.us: Photographs of the Herzog & de Meuro building
 Aplust.net: Architectural review by A+T architecture publishers
Virtual tour of the De Young Museum provided by Google Arts & Culture
 

Art museums and galleries in San Francisco
Golden Gate Park
Institutions accredited by the American Alliance of Museums
Art museums established in 1895
1895 establishments in California
Museums established in 1895
Mesoamerican art museums in the United States
Buildings and structures completed in 1895
Cultural infrastructure completed in 1895
Demolished buildings and structures in California
World's fair architecture in California
Buildings and structures completed in 2005
Cultural infrastructure completed in 2005
Herzog & de Meuron buildings
Ove Arup buildings and structures
Deconstructivism
Twisted buildings and structures
Postmodern architecture in California
De Young family
Fine Arts Museums of San Francisco
African art museums in the United States